Kubalikend may refer to:
 Ərəb Qubalı, Azerbaijan
 Xasıdərə, Azerbaijan